is an EP released by An Cafe on October 29, 2008 in Japan.  The E.P peaked at No. 12 on the Japanese chart.

Track listing

References

An Cafe albums
2008 EPs